The "Vadodara Mahanagar Seva Sadan" or Vadodara Municipal Corporation or VMC, established in July 1950 under the Bombay Provincial Corporation Act, 1949, is responsible for the civic infrastructure and administration of the city of Vadodara. Vadodara Municipal Corporation has been formed with functions to improve the infrastructure of town.

The governing structure of VMC consists of political and administrative wings. The political wing is an elected body of councillors headed by a mayor. The commissioner from the IAS cadre heads the administrative wing and is responsible for strategic and operational planning and management of the corporation. The commissioner takes decisions on behalf of the board or the standing committee formed from the elected councillors to perform the duties of the corporation.

Location 
The office of Vadodara Municipal Corporation is located in Khanderao Market on Chamaraja Road in Vadodara. Chamaraja Road was named after Chamaraja Wodeyar, Maharaja of Mysore who was a close friend of Maharaja Sayajirao Gaekwad III to earmark the friendship between Maharaja Sayajirao Gaekwad III. Similarly a road in Mysore as Sayajirao Road. Chamaraja Road starts from Eastern gate of Lakshmi Vilas Palace and has other prominent landmarks like Kirti Stambh, and others before terminating near Bhagat Singh Chowk.

Elections 2021
BJP = 69.   
Congress = 7.

Total = 76.

Achievement
Vadodara Mahanagar Seva Sadan got the first ever declared national award for 'Energy Conservation in Street Lighting’ by BEE in 2008, for saving energy in street lighting with better service and using latest technology for energy saving. The award was given by Honorable Power minister shree Shushil Kumar Shinde.

Vadodara Municipal Corporation (VMC) repeat the history again in 2010 by acquiring second national award for 'Energy Conservation in Street Lighting’ declared by BEE.

Total area of coverage of Vadodara Municipal Corporation is 220 Sq. Kilometers and total population of the municipality is 20 Lakh (2007-2008). 1691 kilometers of street lighting is covered in Vadodara (2007-2008). Vadodara Municipal Corporation is the first in the country to implement international level lighting, lowest life cycle cost of the entire project and Intelligent street light controllers with GSM monitoring and controlling system manufactured by Instruments Universal (a local company of Vadodara), for providing good service to citizens, data collection and quick maintenance.

References

External links
 Official website of the Vadodara Municipal Corporation

Municipal corporations in Gujarat
1950 establishments in Bombay State
Government of Vadodara